Rashtriya Democratic Alliance (National Democratic Alliance), was a front of five political parties contesting the 2001 state legislative assembly elections in the Indian state of Assam. RDA included Nationalist Congress Party, Asom Jatiya Sanmilan, Asom Gana Sangram Parishad, Purbanchaliya Loka Parishad and Janata Dal (Secular). RDA should not be confused with National Democratic Alliance.

Defunct political parties in Assam
Political parties with year of establishment missing
Political parties with year of disestablishment missing